Junabee is a rural locality in the Southern Downs Region, Queensland, Australia.

History 
Junabee Provisional School opened in 1904. On 1 January 1909 it became Junabee State School. It closed on 1 May 1939, but reopened in 1953. It closed permanently on 28 January 1963.

A new public hall opened in Junabee on Wednesday 5 August 1908.

Jingarry State School opened on 4 August 1919. It  closed on 28 January 1963. It was at 439 Jingarry Mount Sturt Road.

St George's Anglican Church held its first service on 4 March 1945. It closed in 1973. However, there are mentions of an earlier church dating back to 1908.

On 5 January 1946, the Junabee Memorial Hall was opened at 573 Roona Road. The hall commemorates those who served in World War I and World War II.

Education 
There are no schools in Junabee. The nearest primary schools are Warwick East State School in Warwick to the west, Yangan State School in Yangan to the north-east and Murrays Bridge State School in Murrays Bridge to the south. The nearest secondary school is Warwick State High School in Warwick.

References

External links 

Southern Downs Region
Localities in Queensland